Garageband Xmas EP is a Christmas EP by British artist Lightspeed Champion, released for free on the internet on 8 December 2007.

Track listing

Dev Hynes albums
2007 EPs
Christmas EPs